Himarsha Venkatsamy (born 15 February 1984) is a South African model and actress, known for winning the Kingfisher Calendar Hunt in 2010, defeating Anjali Lavania and Nidhi Sunil in the final round.

She made a special appearance in the 2010 Bollywood romantic comedy I Hate Luv Storys, but her first breakthrough came when she was roped to play Jhumpa in the thriller film Roar: Tigers of the Sundarbans.

Early life
Himarsha was born to South African parents of South Indian origin in Durban, South Africa. She has been a model since the age of 13, when she began dancing at the Durban school she was attending where she was studying art and music. She is married to her long-time Kenyan boyfriend, Abdulkadir Arsenalist.

Career
Himarsha participated in the Kingfisher Calendar Girl Hunt 2009 along with her sister Terushka. She won the contest that was televised on NDTV Good Times. She studied for a physiotherapist at the University of the Witwatersrand, before leaving for India to be a full-time model. She has been a part of the Lakme Fashion Week 2009.

Filmography

References

External links
 

1984 births
Living people
People from Durban
South African female models
South African film actresses
South African people of Indian descent
South African people of Tamil descent
Actresses of Indian descent
Female models of Indian descent
South African expatriate actresses in India
Actresses in Hindi cinema
Actresses in Malayalam cinema
University of the Witwatersrand alumni
21st-century South African actresses